Turnau is a market town at the foot of the Hochschwab in the Styrian District of Bruck-Mürzzuschlag.

Boroughs
Turnau has five boroughs: Turnau, Göriach, Seewiesen, Stübming, and Thal.

Politics
Turnau's mayor is Stefan Hofer of the SPÖ. In its municipal council (15 seats) the party mandates are as follows:
 7 SPÖ
 7 ÖVP
 1 FPÖ

References

Cities and towns in Bruck-Mürzzuschlag District